Lon or LON may refer to:

People 
 Lon (photographer), pseudonym of Alonzo Hanagan, also known as "Lon of New York"
 Lon (name), a list of people with the given name, nickname or surname

Fictional characters 
 Lon Cohen, a character in the Nero Wolfe novels by Rex Stout
 Lon Suder, a character on the television series Star Trek: Voyager

LON 
 Launch on Need, a Space Shuttle rescue mission which would have been mounted to rescue the crew of a Space Shuttle if needed
 League of Nations, the first permanent international organization for maintaining world peace, the predecessor of the United Nations
 Local Operating Network, a networking platform by Echelon Corporation
 Local oxidation nanolithography, a nanofabrication technique

Other uses 
 Lon (butterfly), a genus of butterflies
 Lon protease family, in molecular biology
 lon., abbreviation for longitude
 LON, the IATA airport code covering all airports within the London area of the United Kingdom, see Airports of London
 lon, ISO 639-3 code for the Malawi Lomwe language, spoken in southeastern Malawi

See also
 Lons, a French commune
 37608 Löns, an asteroid